Frédéric Vasseur (born 28 May 1968 in Draveil, Ile-de-France) is a French motorsport engineer and manager with a long career managing Formula-series teams. He is currently the team principal and general manager of Scuderia Ferrari, and was previously the managing director, CEO, and team principal of the Switzerland-based Alfa Romeo Racing.

Career
Vasseur studied aeronautics and engineering before starting his career in the junior Formula-series creating his own team, ASM. Known for his success and fostering talent he eventually moved on to Formula 1 as race director and eventually team principal for Renault F1 before leaving the team in 2016 because of different visions in managing the team to that of the team's senior management. Subsequently, he was hired by Sauber in July 2017.

ASM
Vasseur graduated from ESTACA and founded the ASM team in 1996 which, in partnership with Renault, won the French Formula 3 championship with David Saelens in 1998, and the Formula 3 Euroseries championships in partnership with Mercedes-Benz with Jamie Green, Lewis Hamilton, Paul di Resta and Romain Grosjean, from 2004 to 2007.

ART Grand Prix
In 2004, he joined Nicolas Todt to form the ART Grand Prix team that won the GP2 Series championship with Nico Rosberg in 2005 and Lewis Hamilton in 2006.

Spark Racing Technology
At the end of 2013, he obtained the contract from the FIA to construct the 40 chassis for the inaugural Formula E series for his newly formed venture Spark Racing Technology; the company has continued to keep this contract.

Renault Sport F1 Team
Vasseur joined Renault Sport as team principal of the newly formed Renault Sport Formula One Team during the 2016 Formula One season. He resigned at the end of the 2016 season after disagreements with the managing director, Cyril Abiteboul, on how the team should be run.

Sauber F1 Team
On 12 July 2017, Sauber announced that they had signed up Vasseur as managing director and CEO of Sauber Motorsport AG as well as team principal of the Sauber F1 Team.

Scuderia Ferrari
On 13 December 2022, Scuderia Ferrari announced the departure of Team Principal Mattia Binotto. They subsequently appointed Vasseur as his replacement. He is the fourth non-Italian and the second Frenchman to head the Scuderia, after Jean Todt.

Personal life 
Vasseur married on 31 July 1999 and has four children.

References

 

Formula One team principals
Motorsport team owners
Renault people
Ferrari people
French motorsport people
French automotive engineers
People from Draveil
1968 births
Living people
Sportspeople from Essonne
Alfa Romeo people
Sauber Motorsport
Alfa Romeo in Formula One